Ghadames Air (IATA: NJ, ICAO:GMS) is a Libyan airline based at Mitiga International Airport.

Destinations
Ghadames Air, a rebranding of Ghadames Air transport, resumed flights in spring 2022, after a hiatus of several years.

It serves the following scheduled destinations:

Benghazi - Benina international airport
Istanbul - Istanbul Atatürk Airport
Jeddah - Jeddah international airport
Tripoli - Mitiga International Airport base
Tunis - Tunis Carthage Airport
As of February 2023, flights to the following destination seem suspended

Khartoum - Khartoum Airport

Fleet
Following the loss of its Air Operator's Certificate in 2020, Ghadames air transport sold its two derelict Airbus A320-200 and its Fokker 100 and the rebranded company bought two second-hand Boeing 737-300. As of 2023, the Ghadames Air fleet consisted of the following aircraft:
 2 Boeing 737-300

References 

Defunct airlines of Libya
Airlines established in 2004
Airlines disestablished in 2020